Salala is a town in Bong County, Liberia.  It was the site of a refugee camp for over 50,000 people who have fled the violence in Liberia ("The Humanitarian Situation in Liberia")

Salala is divided into two parts--Salala and Saysayla. Each part has a population of about 3000, according to data gathered from the clinic in 2020, for a total population of about 6000. It has many schools, including Martha Tubman Public School, Gormalon Public School, Faith Foundation, a Catholic School, a Lutheran School, and a Salvation Army school. There is a mosque and many churches. There is an entertainment center, a business center, and shops on the main road.

There is a small daily market, as well as a large market on Fridays, located on the Old Road.

Populated places in Liberia
Bong County